Curitiba is the capital and largest city in the state of Paraná in Brazil. The city's population was 1,963,726 , making it the eighth most populous city in Brazil and the largest in Brazil's South Region. The Curitiba Metropolitan area comprises 29 municipalities with a total population of over 3,731,769 (IBGE estimate in 2021), making it the ninth most populous metropolitan area in the country.

It is located west of the seaport of Paranaguá and is served by the Afonso Pena International and Bacacheri airports. Curitiba is an important cultural, political, and economic center in Latin America and hosts the Federal University of Paraná, established in 1912.

In the 1700s, Curitiba's favorable location between cattle-breeding countryside and marketplaces led to a successful cattle trade and the city's first major expansion. Later, between 1850 and 1950, it grew due to logging and agricultural expansion in Paraná State (first Araucaria angustifolia logging, later mate and coffee cultivation and in the 1970s wheat, corn and soybean cultivation). In the 1850s, waves of European immigrants arrived in Curitiba, mainly Germans, Italians, Poles and Ukrainians, contributing to the city's economic and cultural development. Nowadays, only small numbers of immigrants arrive, primarily from Middle Eastern and other South American countries.

Curitiba's biggest expansion occurred after the 1960s, with innovative urban planning that allowed the population to grow from some hundreds of thousands to more than a million people. Curitiba's economy is based on industry and services and is the fourth largest in Brazil. Economic growth occurred in parallel to a substantial inward flow of Brazilians from other parts of the country, as approximately half of the city's population was not born in Curitiba.

Curitiba is one of the few Brazilian cities with a very high Human Development Index (0.856) and in 2010 it was awarded the Global Sustainable City Award, given to cities and municipalities that excel in sustainable urban development. According to US magazine Reader's Digest, Curitiba is the best "Brazilian Big City" in which to live. Curitiba's crime rate is considered low by Brazilian standards and the city is considered one of the safest cities in Brazil for youth. The city is also regarded as the best in which to invest in Brazil. Curitiba was one of the host cities of the 1950 FIFA World Cup, and again for the 2014 FIFA World Cup. Despite its good social indicators, the city has a higher unemployment rate than other cities in the state.

Etymology
One theory is that the name "Curitiba" comes from the Tupi words kurí tyba, "many araucária seeds" due to the large number of Paraná pines pinecones in the region prior to its founding.

Another version, also using words from the Tupi language, is that it originates in the combination of kurit (pine tree) and yba (large amount).

The Portuguese, who founded a settlement on the site in 1693, named it "Vila da Nossa Senhora da Luz dos Pinhais" (Village of "Our Lady of the Light" of the Pines).

The name was changed to "Curitiba" in 1721. Curitiba officially became a town in 1812, spelling its name as "Curityba".

An alternative spelling was "Coritiba". This was used in press and state documents. A state decree in 1919 settled the dispute by adopting "Curitiba".

History

At the end of the 17th century, Curitiba's agriculture was only for subsistence and its main economic activities were mineral extraction. Waves of European immigrants arrived after 1850, mainly Poles, Italians, Germans (mostly Volga Germans from Russia) and Ukrainians.

Cattlemen drove their herds from Rio Grande do Sul to the state of São Paulo, turning Curitiba into an important intermediate trading post.

The Paranaguá–Curitiba railroad was opened in 1885.

Around the beginning of the 20th century, Curitiba benefited from the wealth of the yerba mate mills. The owners (known as "barões da erva-mate") built mansions in the capital. These have mostly been preserved in the districts of Batel and Alto da Glória.

In the 1940s and 1950s, Alfred Agache, co-founder of the French Society for Urban Studies, was hired to produce its first city plan. It emphasized a "star" of boulevards, with public amenities downtown, an industrial district and sanitation. It was followed in part, but the plan was too expensive to complete.

Geography

Climate

Curitiba has a typically humid subtropical highland climate (Köppen: Cfb), with some characteristics of the oceanic climate due to its abundant precipitation all year round and the relatively warm, but not hot, summer. The city's mild winters, due to its low latitude, differentiate its climate from typically temperate ones. Temperatures can drop below  on the coldest days. However, during cold snaps, daytime temperatures might not rise above , and on rare occasions, above . However, temperatures above  at night are rare. Snowfall was experienced in 1889, 1892, 1912, 1928 (two days), 1942, 1955, 1957, 1962, 1975, 1988, 2013 and 2020. Accumulation, however, is much rarer. It was last recorded in 1975.

The terrain's flatness hinders water drainage after rain, therefore providing water vapor for the atmosphere. Cold fronts come year round, often from Antarctica and Argentina, bringing tropical storms in summer and cold winds and frost in the winter. They can move very quickly, with no more than one day between the start of the southern winds and the start of rain. Curitiba's weather is also influenced by the dry air masses that dominate Brazil's midwest most of the year, bringing hot and dry weather, sometimes even in winter.

Vegetation

Curitiba is located in the area of the Ombrophilous Mixed Forest (also known as Araucaria moist forests), a sub-type of the Atlantic Forest. In Curitiba it is possible to find steppes, forests and other formations. The local vegetation consists of remnants of the Paraná (or Brazilian) pine (Araucaria angustifolia), which resisted the efforts of settlers. The Paraná pines are in private and public areas and are protected from logging. The Municipal Secretariat of the Environment maintains a botanical garden and three greenhouses that produce 150,000 native and exotic seedlings: 16,000 fruit trees, 260,000 flowers, foliage and underbrush specimens and the maintenance of another 350,000 seedlings.

Curitiba's green area itself matches the size of other large Brazilian cities. The vegetation of Curitiba encompasses a large population of purple and yellow ipês (tabebuias), who flower at the end of winter. The yellow ipê is one of the city's most common tree.

Hydrography

The catchment area of Curitiba consists of rivers and streams that cross the city in different directions, grouped in six river basins. The main rivers that form the city's watershed are: Atuba River, Belém River, Barigüi River, Passaúna River, Ribeirão dos Padilhas and the Iguaçu River, all with characteristics of dendritic drainage. Curitiba has been working since the 1970s on alternatives to minimize the negative impacts of urbanization on rivers. An example is the construction of parks along the rivers with artificial lakes, which absorb and retain water for longer periods of time, minimizing floods.
After many studies of local water flows, most rivers were found to be subject to a canalization process. Other alternatives developed to minimize the negative effects of urbanization are the implementation of programs for environmental education, inspection and monitoring, elaboration and application of legislation and infrastructure works.

Topography

Curitiba has a topography of smooth, rounded hills, giving it a relatively regular shape.

Mountain ranges and sets of rocky hills surround parts of the city, including the Serra do Mar, a hill range between the shore of the Atlantic Ocean and the First Plateau in Paraná.

Government

, the mayor is Rafael Greca, who replaced Gustavo Fruet. The City Council of Curitiba has 38 councillors elected since 2004. Curitiba is divided into nine regional governments (equivalent to subprefecture), who manage the municipality's 75 districts. The Rua da Cidadania ("Street of Citizenship") is the symbol of administrative decentralization; it is a reference point and a meeting place. Several units are annexed to public transport terminals. Their nuclei offer services in the local, state and federal areas.

Jaime Lerner is perhaps Curitiba's best-known mayor. He was the mayor three times, the first time in the early 1970s. His leadership was crucial to some major changes in the city. Curitiba has built parks instead of canals to reduce flooding; used parks to make the city more liveable; pedestrianised the downtown area; built a Bus Rapid Transit (BRT), a bus system that works similarly to a light rail system; and started a massive recycling scheme that included giving people bus tokens in return for waste.

Demographics

Ethnic groups

According to the 2010 IBGE Census, 1,678,965 people resided in the city of Curitiba. The census revealed 1,381,938 White people (78.9%), 294,127 Pardo (Multiracial) people (16.8%), 49,978 Afro-Brazilian people (2.9%), 23,138 Asian people (1.4%), 2,693 Amerindian people (0.2%).

In 2010, Curitiba was Brazil's 8th most populous city.

In 2010, the city had 359,201 opposite-sex couples and 974 same-sex couples. The population of Curitiba was 52.3% female and 47.7% male.

As with most of Southern Brazil's population, Curitiba is mostly inhabited by European descendants. The first Europeans to arrive were of Portuguese origin, during the 17th century. They intermarried with the native people and with the African slaves.

Up until the 19th century, the inhabitants of the city of Curitiba were natives and mixed-race, Portuguese and Spanish immigrants. In 1808 foreigners were granted the right to ownership of land, and in 1853 Parana became an independent province, and these events resulted in a substantial number of immigrants from Europe.

The first non-Iberian (Portuguese and Spaniard) immigrants to come to the city were German.

The Memorial of Polish Immigration was inaugurated on 13 December 1980, after the visit of Pope John Paul II in June. The seven wooden log houses are parts of this memorial area, as a memento of the Polish immigrants' struggles and faith. Objects like an old wagon, pipe of cabbage and a print of the Black Madonna of Częstochowa (patron saint of the Polish people), form parts of the memorial. The first group of Poles arrived in Curitiba around 1871. Curitiba has the biggest colony of Polish immigrants in Brazil.

Italian immigrants started arriving in Brazil in 1875 and in Curitiba in 1878, coming mainly from the Veneto and Trento regions of Northern Italy. They settled mostly in the Santa Felicidade neighborhood, still a centre of the Italian community.

Nearly 20,000 Ukrainian immigrants settled there between 1895 and 1897, consisting mostly of peasants from Galicia who immigrated to Brazil to become farmers. Around 300,000 Ukrainian-Brazilians live in Paraná. The State of Paraná has the largest Ukrainian community and Slavic community.

Curitiba has a Jewish community that was originally established in the 1870s. Much of the early Jewish congregation has been assimilated. In 1937 with the rise of Nazi Germany, notable German Jewish academics migrated to Brazil, some settling in Curitiba. Physicist César Lattes and former mayors Jaime Lerner and Saul Raiz were Jewish. A Holocaust memorial is present in the city. The community centre, a Jewish school, a Chabad house (Beit Chabad), a synagogue, and two Jewish cemeteries are there, one of which was defiled in 2004.

Japanese immigrants began arriving in 1915, with a larger contingent arriving in 1924. Curitiba received a significant Japanese influx. They settled mostly between Paraná and São Paulo state. The city has the second largest Japanese community in Brazil, behind only São Paulo, according to IBGE. Although both cities have around the same proportion of Japanese descendants, other large cities in the interior of the state of Paraná, such as Maringá and Londrina, have an even higher rate. Some estimates suggest that more than 40,000 Japanese-Brazilians live in Curitiba.

Religion

According to the 2010 Brazilian Census, most of the population (62.36%) is Roman Catholic, other religious groups include Protestants or evangelicals (24.03%), Spiritists (2.8%), Nones 6.71%, and people with other religions (3.69).

Economy

Since it was declared capital of the State of Paraná in 1853, the city has gone through several major urban planning projects to avoid uncontrolled growth and thus has become an international role model in dealing with issues including transportation and the environment. The city is Brazil's second largest car manufacturer. Its economy is based on industry, commerce and services. For that reason, Curitiba is considered by many investors to be the best location for investment in Brazil.

The city receives more than two million tourists every year. Most arrive via the Afonso Pena International Airport, where almost 60,000 flights land annually.

According to IPEA data, the GDP in 2006 was 32 billion reals, without including agriculture and livestock (0.03%). Industry represented 34.13% and the commerce and service sectors 65.84%. Cidade Industrial de Curitiba, the industrial district, is home to many multinational industries, such as Nissan, Renault, Volkswagen, Philip Morris, Audi, Volvo, HSBC, Siemens, ExxonMobil, Electrolux and Kraft Foods, as well as many well-known national industries, such as Sadia, O Boticário and Positivo Informática.

Curitiba's infrastructure makes bus travel fast and convenient, effectively creating demand for bus use in the same way that the infrastructure of traditional cities creates demand for private motor vehicles. In July 2001, Curitiba became Brazil's first city to receive the prize "Pole of Information Technology", granted by InfoExame magazine. According to the magazine, the companies of "Technology and Information Technology" based in Curitiba in 2001 achieved  in revenues, representing a growth of 21% over the previous year.

The city's 30-year economic growth rate is 7.1%, higher than the national average of 4.2%, and per capita income is 66% higher than the Brazilian average. Between 1975 and 1995, Curitiba's domestic product grew by some 75% more than the entire State of Paraná, and 48% more than Brazil as a whole. In 1994, tourism generated - 4% of the city's net income. Curitiba has municipal health, education and day care networks, neighborhood libraries shared by schools and citizens and Citizenship Streets, where buildings provide essential public services, sports and cultural facilities near transportation terminals. At the Open University, residents can take courses in subjects such as mechanics, hair styling and environmental protection for a small fee. Policies for job creation and income generation became part of the city's strategic planning in the 1990s, for the metropolitan area as well as the city.

Since 1990, the Municipal Housing Fund has provided financial support to housing for lower income populations. After national housing finance collapsed in 1985, just as people from the countryside poured into Curitiba, the city's public housing program bought one of the few remaining large plots of land, "Novo Bairro" (New Neighborhood), as home for 50,000 families. While landowners built the houses themselves, each received a pair of trees and an hour's consultation with an architect to help them develop their plan. COHAB also built Technology Street, an avenue of 24 homes in the centre of Novo Bairro, each built using different construction techniques.

Seven large shopping malls are found in Curitiba: Mueller, Estação, Curitiba, Crystal, Palladium, Patio Batel and Park Barigüi. The Rua das Flores (Street of Flowers) is home to the majority of stores. The area is pedestrianized, with no cars around the centre. An essential element of Curitiba shopping is the Feira do Largo da Ordem, or Largo da Ordem Street Fair.

Curitiba is the second pole on technological innovation in Brazil, according to IPEA (Applied Economic Research Institute). It is Brazil's second best, and South America's fifth best, city for business, according to America Economia Magazine/2005 and 2006. The best destination for business, according to Veja Magazine of 2007. The third position among the Champions of Infrastructure, Exame Magazine of 2006. The second best city to work in Southern Brazil, according to Você S.A. Magazine of 2005. The 49th position, MasterCard Worldwide Centers of Commerce: Emerging Markets Index of 2008. One of the highlights according to the survey Offshoring Horizons performed by Watson Wyatt of 2007. One of the 10 global sustainability centres, according to Ethisphere Institute of 2008. Curitiba is also home to the largest cancer hospital in the South of Brazil, Erasto Gaertner Hospital.

Attractions

Attractions in the city include:

 Shrine of the Divine Mercy: established by the Marian Fathers near Estrada do Ganchinho in the district of Umbará.
Municipal market: Located near the city's central bus station, it houses numerous shops selling imported goods, organic products, and vegan food. The food court has a lot of Asian food, vegan food and organic meals.
 Italian Woods: Hosts local celebrations.
 Wire Opera House: Built on the site of an abandoned quarry.
 Oscar Niemeyer Museum: Artists from Paraná and other parts of Brazil have their work represented in the museum. Three rooms in the Eye are dedicated exclusively to photography.

 Panoramic Tower: The 360-foot tall lookout tower allows travelers a 360° view of Curitiba and has a telephone museum on the ground floor.
 Portugal Wood: Homage to the Portuguese-Brazilian bonds, this space is highlighted by a track following a small brook, where one can see drawn on tiles excerpts from famous Portuguese language poets, as well as a tribute to the great Portuguese navigators and their discoveries. Families are often seen picnicking on the grounds.
 Curitiba International Ecological Marathon: The Maratona Ecológica Internacional de Curitiba ("Curitiba International Ecological marathon") is held in November and is known as the hardest in Brazil, because it happens in the end of the year in the summer heat, and because of the hilly course.
 Tourism Line: The Linha Tourismo bus stops at key tourist attractions across the city.
Capão da Imbuia Wood

Education
More than 183 universities operate in the state of Paraná.

Tertiary educational institutions
 Universidade Federal do Paraná (UFPR) – Federal University of Paraná – This federal university is the largest of Paraná, with more than 35.000 students. The first university of Brazil;
 Universidade Tecnológica Federal do Paraná (UTFPR) – Federal Technologic University of Parana is the first university of technology from Brazil;
 Instituto Federal de Educação, Ciência e Tecnologia do Paraná – Paraná Federal Institute of Education, Science and Technology;
 Universidade Positivo (UP) – Positivo University, private institution;
 Universidade Estadual do Paraná (UNESPAR) – State University of Paraná, which includes EMBAP (Paraná School of Fine Arts) and FAP (College of Arts of Paraná);
 Pontifícia Universidade Católica do Paraná (PUCPR) – Pontifical Catholic University of Parana – A major private university;
 ESIC Business and Marketing School – International Website ESIC
 Centro Universitário Curitiba (UNICURITIBA) – University Center Curitiba, old Law School of Curitiba.
 Centro Universitário Internacional (UNINTER)
 Fundação de Estudos Sociais do Paraná (FESPPR) – The First Economy Graduation in Paraná, since 1938

Educational system
In the 1990s, the city started a project called Faróis do Saber ("Lighthouses of Knowledge"). These libraries are free educational centres that include libraries, free Internet access and other cultural resources. Libraries work with municipal schools, offering a collection of approximately 5000 books, and provide cultural reference and leisure.

Among Brazilian capitals, Curitiba has the highest literacy rate, and ranks number 1 in education among the Brazilian capitals.

Urban planning

Curitiba has a planned transportation system, which includes lanes on major streets devoted to a bus rapid transit system. The buses are split into three sections (bi-articulated) and stop at designated elevated tubes, complete with access for disabled riders. Buses charge one price regardless of distance.

The city preserves and cares for its green areas, boasting  of green space per inhabitant.

In the 1940s and 1950s, Alfred Agache, cofounder of the French Society for Urban Studies, was hired to produce the first city plan. It emphasised a star of boulevards, with public amenities downtown, an industrial district and sanitation. The plan was too expensive to complete.

By the 1960s, Curitiba's population had reached 430,000. Some residents feared that the growth in population threatened to damage the character of the city. In 1964, Mayor Ivo Arzua solicited proposals for urban design. Architect Jaime Lerner, who later became mayor, led a team from the Universidade Federal do Paraná that suggested strict controls on urban sprawl, reduced traffic in the downtown area, preservation of Curitiba's Historic Sector and a convenient and affordable public transit system.

This plan, known as the Curitiba Master Plan, was adopted in 1968. Lerner closed XV de Novembro St. to vehicles, because it had high pedestrian traffic. The plan had a new road design to minimise traffic: the Trinary Road System. This used two one-way streets moving in opposite directions that surround a smaller, two-lane street where the express buses have an exclusive lane. Five of these roads form a star that converges on the city centre. Land farther from these roads is zoned for lower density development, to pull traffic away from the main roads. In a number of areas subject to floods, buildings were condemned and the land became parks.

Today, Curitiba is considered one of the world's best examples of urban planning. In June 1996, the chairman of the Habitat II summit of mayors and urban planners in Istanbul praised Curitiba as "the most innovative city in the country".

Curitiba was recently recommended by UNESCO as a model for the reconstruction of the cities of Afghanistan. In the 1980s, the RIT (Rede Integrada de Transporte, Integrated Transport Network) was created. At the same time, the city began building the "Faróis de Saber" (Lighthouses of Knowledge) educational centres.

In 2007, the city placed third in a list of "15 Green Cities" in the world, according to Grist magazine, after Reykjavík in Iceland and Portland, Oregon in the United States. As a result, according to one survey, 99% of Curitibans are happy with their hometown.

Jaime Lerner suggests urban acupuncture as the future solution for contemporary urban issues; focusing on very narrow pressure points in cities, can create positive ripple effects. Urban "acupuncture" reclaims land for the public and emphasizes the importance of community development through small interventions in design of cities. It emphasises pinpoint interventions that can be accomplished quickly to create an immediate impact.

The "capacity building job line" was created to accelerate economic development. About 15,000 new jobs were generated by 2013.

According to Jonas Rabinovitch, a United Nations senior adviser and former planner at the Curitiba Research and Urban Planning Institute (IPPUC), up to 8% of Curitiba's population still lived in favelas as of 2016. According to 2010 census data collected by IBGE, 49,700 homes in Curitiba form part of irregular settlements. This is equivalent to 163300 people. The population growth of favelas was 12.4% between 2000 and 2010, higher than the population in general (10.3%).

For transportation, Curitiba has over 2 million people travel by bus while the city also has the most cars per capita in Brazil.

Culture

In January 1973 the Fundação Cultural de Curitiba was set up, with the aim of promoting culture.

The Cultural Complex Solar do Barão features the Photography Museum, the Engravings Museum and the Posters Museu. The MuMA – Museu Metropolitano de Arte (Museum of Metropolitan Art) displays artists from the state of Paraná as well as renowned Brazilian painters such as Pancetti, Guignard and Di Cavalcanti.

The Polish Immigrants Memorial, also known as The Pope's Woods, offers an enjoyable area surrounded by trees, which makes it a perfect choice for a stroll. The Polish Pope John Paul II blessed the first replica of the traditional Polish houses that beautifully make up the Bosque do Papa when he visited the city in 1980.

In 2003, Curitiba received the "American Capital of Culture" title, granted by the OAS (Organization of American States).

Gastronomy 
The capital of Paraná is an important gastronomic center in Brazil, and the typical foods of Curitiba tend be very different when compared to other common Brazilian dishes. The dishes of the local cuisine are a reflection of the history of the municipality and the typical foods. Curitiba's cuisine has mainly been influenced by Italian and German immigrants.

Curitiba is the home of the largest restaurant in the Americas, and one of the world's largest restaurants, Restaurante Madalosso. Madalosso can feed more than 4,600 diners at a time in its 10 dining rooms, all named after Italian cities. Founded in 1963, the all-you-can-eat Madalosso focuses on family-style Italian cuisine: ravioli, lasagna, gnocchi, and salads rounded out with grilled meats.

Arts and entertainment
Curitiba was Brazil's first city to have an IMAX movie theatre. Curitiba has many theaters. The largest and most important one is the Guaíra Theater. Every year, in April, it hosts the Curitiba Theater Festival.

Museums
Brazilian architect Oscar Niemeyer designed the extravagant state museum of Curitiba. Its design includes a gravity-defying construction that was intended to look like a Paraná Pine, one of the city's symbols, but is widely interpreted by locals as an eye, which gave the Museum its nickname – Museu do Olho, or Museum of the Eye. In keeping with Curitiba's history and culture of science, the museum offers many science exhibitions, including biennial exhibitions. The Curitiba museum includes the Oscar Niemeyer auditorium.

 Museu Paranaense ("Paranaense Museum") – dedicated to arts and history;
 Oscar Niemeyer Museum – the largest museum of South America, dedicated to plastic arts;
 Museu de Arte Sacra ("Religious Art Museum") – the focus is Christian art;
 Museu do Expedicionário ("Museum of the Expeditionary") – dedicated to Brazilian participation in World War II;
 Museu de Arte Contemporânea ("Museum of Contemporary Art");
 Museu da Imagem e do Som ("Image and Sound Museum") – about cinema and photography;
 Museu Egípcio e Rosa Cruz ("Egyptian Museum and Rosicrucianism") - ancient Egypt antiquities
 Museu Metropolitano de Arte de Curitiba ("Metropolitan Museum of Art in Curitiba") – modern art;
 Museu de História Natural ("Natural History Museum") – biology and botany.
 Museu do Holocausto ("Holocaust Museum")

Festivals
Curitiba has yearly festivals related to arts, such as Curitiba Theatre Festival and the Music Workshop of Curitiba. Others celebrate immigrants festivals, such as the Grape Feast ("Festa da Uva"), which is related to Italian immigrants, and the four Matsuri, related to Japanese immigrants.

The four Matsuri set in Curitiba are: Imin Matsuri (Japanese: 移民祭り, "Immigration Festival") which celebrates the arrival of Japanese immigrants in Brazil, Haru Matsuri (Japanese: 春祭り, "Spring Festival") which celebrates the end of winter and coming of spring, Hana Matsuri (Japanese: 花祭り, "Flower Festival"), which celebrates the birth of Sakyamuni, and Seto Matsuri ("Seto Festival"), in honor of Cláudio Seto, comic artist, precursor of the manga in Brazil and idealist of the first Matsuri in Curitiba.

Curitiba also hold the famous Psycho Carnival, a three-day festival that happens during the Brazilian Carnival, but devoted to psychobilly and rockabilly genres, attracting people from all over the world. In the same occasion the Zombie Walk also happens. The 2016 edition took more than 20.000 people to the streets.

UN Convention on Biodiversity
On 20–31 March 2006 the Convention on biodiversity took place in Pinhais (a city near Curitiba), addressing items of the 1993 Convention on Biological Diversity adopted by 188 countries.

Transportation

Public transport

Curitiba's public transportation consists entirely of buses. It opened the world's second bus rapid transit (BRT) system, Rede Integrada de Transporte, in 1974. The popularity of Curitiba's BRT has effected a modal shift from automobile travel to bus travel. Based on 1991 traveler survey results, it was estimated that the introduction of the BRT had caused a reduction of about 27 million auto trips per year, annually saving about 27 million liters of fuel. In particular, 28 percent of BRT riders previously traveled by car. Compared to eight other Brazilian cities of its size, Curitiba uses about 30 percent less fuel per capita, resulting in one of the country's lowest rates of ambient air pollution. Some 1,100 buses make 12,500 trips every day, serving more than 1.3 million passengers, 50 times the number from 20 years ago. Eighty percent of travelers use the express or direct bus services. Curitibanos spend only about 10 percent of their income on transportation, far below the national average.

Curitiba has in its transport fleet the largest bi-articulated bus in the world, with 28 meters in length and capacity for 250 passengers. The bus operates only with soy-based biofuel, which reduces pollutant emissions by 50%.

The cost is estimated at 4.62 billion reais.

Roads
Moving around in a car can be difficult in and around the city centre because of the many one-way streets and frequent traffic jams. The Trinary Road System allows quick access to the city centre for drivers. Some avenues are spacious and laid out in a grid. Apart from some points around the city centre, Munhoz da Rocha Street and Batel Avenue, traffic jams are not severe.

Air

Afonso Pena International Airport is Curitiba's main airport. It is located in the nearby city of São José dos Pinhais. All commercial flights operate from this airport.

Afonso Pena International Airport was evaluated as the best airport in Brazil according to the Ministry of Infrastructure of Brazil.

The airport obtained the highest marks among all participants for queuing time at customs and the cordiality of customs officials; availability of sockets and seats in the departure lounge; quality of airport signage and vehicle parking facilities; availability and cleanliness of the toilets; general cleaning; airport thermal and acoustic comfort; quality of information on baggage claim conveyor panels, as well as availability of public transport to the airport.

There is also the Bacacheri Airport, a smaller general aviation facility. It serves the handling of small and medium business aircraft.

Rail 
Brazil's transportation and railway company, Rumo, has its headquarters in Curitiba. Serra Verde Express provides a tourist train through scenic country to Morretes and Paranaguá.

Others
The city has  of bike routes, used by around 30 thousand bikers daily. City streets carry almost one million vehicles, of which 2,253 are orange Taxis. To service these vehicles, more than 355 petrol stations serve the city.

Curitiba public transportation statistics
The average amount of time people spend commuting with public transit in Curitiba, for example to and from work, on a weekday is 72 min. 21% of public transit riders, ride for more than 2 hours every day. The average amount of time people wait at a stop or station for public transit is 17 min, while 33% of riders wait for over 20 minutes on average every day. The average distance people usually ride in a single trip with public transit is 7 km, while 12% travel for over 12 km in a single direction.

Sports

Curitiba has three teams in the city: Athletico Paranaense, Coritiba and Paraná Clube. Paraná Clube plays at Estádio Durival Britto e Silva, Coritiba plays at Estádio Major Antônio Couto Pereira, and Club Athletico Paranaense plays at Estádio Joaquim Américo Guimarães. Both Coritiba and Athletico Paranaense have won Campeonato Brasileiro Série A, in 1985 and 2001, respectively. Estádio Joaquim Américo Guimarães was one of the 12 stadiums to host games of the 2014 FIFA World Cup held in Brazil. The traditional stadium Vila Capanema have hosted the 1950 FIFA World Cup which still is home to Paraná Clube.

The Autódromo Internacional de Curitiba (Curitiba International Raceway) is located in nearby Pinhais.

Curitiba has also one of the main rugby union clubs in Brazil, Curitiba Rugby Clube, national champions in 2014.

A number of top stars in mixed martial arts are Curitiba natives, including the Rua brothers Maurício "Shogun" and Murilo "Ninja", Wanderlei Silva, Anderson Silva, and women's MMA pioneer Cris Cyborg. Much of the city's success in MMA comes from it hosting the influential Chute Boxe Academy and its successor Universidade da luta.

Neighborhoods

Most districts of Curitiba were born of colonial groups, formed by families of European immigrants in the second half of the nineteenth century. The centro (downtown or central business district), where the city was founded, is the most bustling area, housing most of the financial institutions of Curitiba.

Bairros (neighborhoods) of Curitiba define the city's geographical divisions. Administrative powers are not delegated to neighborhoods, although neighborhood associations work to improve their communities.
Curitiba is divided into 9 regional governments (boroughs) covering the 75 neighborhoods.

Civic Center (In Portuguese: Centro Cívico) is where the main government buildings are located. It was the first neighborhood in the municipality of Curitiba, capital of the state of Paraná. The name means 'Center of the Citizen''. It was conceived in 1953, with the greater independence which came with the creation of a new state.

In August 2011, the Civic Center was listed as an urban and architectural ensemble. The buildings on the central axis of Avenida Cândido de Abreu are protected, including Plaza 19 de Dezembro, Tiradentes State College, Courts of Justice, Accounts and Jury buildings, the Iguaçu Palace, the Oscar Niemeyer Museum and the Square Our Lady of Salette.

International relations

Twin towns – sister cities
Curitiba is twinned with:

 Asunción, Paraguay
 Coimbra, Portugal
 Columbus, United States
 Guadalajara, Mexico
 Hangzhou, China
 Himeji, Japan
 Jacksonville, United States
 Kraków, Poland
 Lyon, France 
 Montevideo, Uruguay
 Orlando, United States
 Santa Cruz de la Sierra, Bolivia
 Suwon, South Korea
 Treviso, Italy
 Miami-Dade, United States

Cooperation agreements
Curitiba has cooperation agreements with:
 Lisbon, Portugal

Notable people

Architecture

 Jaime Lerner
 João Batista Vilanova Artigas

Arts

 Abraskadabra - Ska punk band
 Alfredo Andersen – Norwegian painter and sculptor
 Alexandre Slaviero – actor
 Andrade Muricy – composer and musical and literary critic
 Dalton Trevisan – writer
 Dinho Ouro Preto – rock musician
 Emílio de Meneses – poet and journalist, "immortal" of the Brazilian Academy of Letters
 Fernanda Machado – actress
 Florian Essenfelder – piano maker
 Francisco Lachowski – super model
 Guido Viaro – Italian painter and teacher
 Guilherme Weber – actor
 Guta Stresser – actress
 Icarius De Menezes – creative director
 Isabeli Fontana – super model
 Isadora Ribeiro – actress
 Jaime Lerner – architect and urbanist
 Katiuscia Canoro – actress
 Luís Melo – actor
 Luiz Carlos Alborghetti – TV host
 Marjorie Estiano – actress and singer
 Dow Raiz – rapper
 Paulo Leminski – poet and writer
 Simone Spoladore – actress
 Tasso da Silveira – poet, journalist, deputy and professor

Aviation
 Pierre Clostermann – World War II French pilot, engineer
 Egon Albrecht – World War II German flying ace

Politics
 Sérgio Moro – Politician

Science
 Alex Kipman – scientist
 César Lattes – physicist
 Ned Kock – systems scientist
 Newton da Costa – mathematician
 Ricardo Ramina – physician

Sports
 Football

 Mixed martial arts
 Cristiane "Cyborg" Justino
 Bruno Pucci
 Mauricio "Shogun" Rua
 Murilo "Ninja" Rua
 Wanderlei Silva
 Anderson Silva

 Motorsports
 Augusto Farfus – DTM driver for BMW
 Enrique Bernoldi – Formula One driver – IndyCar driver
 Raul Boesel – Formula One driver, IndyCar driver, 1987 World Sportscar Championship champion
 Ricardo Zonta – Formula One driver, 1998 FIA GT Championship champion

 Basketball
 Rolando Ferreira – (Gold medalist at the 1987 Pan American Games), former Portland Trail Blazers player

 Beach volleyball
 Emanuel Rego (gold medalist in 2004 Olympics, bronze in 2008 Olympics and silver in 2012 Olympics)
 Agatha Bednarczuk (silver medalist in 2016 Olympics)

 Horse racing
 João Moreira – jockey

 Poker
 Alexandre Gomes (WSOP and WPT world champion 2008–2009)

See Also
History of Paraná
Luxembourgish Brazilians

References

Bibliography

External links

 Official homepage

 
Planned cities in Brazil
Populated places established in 1693
1693 establishments in the Portuguese Empire